Spadina Crescent Bridge is a deck arch bridge that spans a ravine in  City Park along Spadina Crescent in Saskatoon, Saskatchewan, Canada.

The bridge was constructed in 1930, replacing an earlier wooden structure. It was built by the Saskatoon Contracting Co., owned by Leon and Paul Prescesky. In 1933, a series of ponds were dug in the ravine as a Depression-era relief project, meant to beautify "Central Park", as the area was known as then. The pond system was extended in the 1950s, but has since been filled in. The remaining ravine still serves as an outlet for storm water.

See also
 List of bridges in Canada
 List of bridges

References

Bridges completed in 1930
Bridges in Saskatoon
Deck arch bridges
Road bridges in Saskatchewan